Kaynarca may refer to:

Places
 Kaynarca, Biga
 Kaynarca, Bor, a village in Bor district of Niğde Province, Turkey
 Kaynarca, Horasan
 Kaynarca, İznik
 Kaynarca, Sakarya, a town and district of Sakarya Province in Turkey 
 Kaynarca, Pendik, a town in Pendik district of Istanbul, Turkey
 Kaynardzha, a village in northeastern Bulgaria, part of Silistra Province
 Kaynardzha Municipality, a municipality in Silistra Province, northeastern Bulgaria

People with the surname
 Oktay Kaynarca (born 1965), Turkish actor

Turkish-language surnames